Otto Šimánek (28 April 1925 – 8 May 1992) was a Czechoslovak actor. Šimánek worked at the Prague City Theater. He also taught mime at the Prague Conservatory. He became internationally known through the role of the silent wizard Pan Tau.

References

External links 
 
 Otto Šimánek at the CSFD 

1925 births
1992 deaths
People from Třešť
Czechoslovak mimes
Czechoslovak male stage actors
Czechoslovak male television actors
Czechoslovak male film actors
Academic staff of the Prague Conservatory